The list of major cities conquered by the Ottoman Empire is  below. Since it is impossible to include all cities, only the most populous cities, capitals  and the cities with strategical or historical importance are shown.

Cities 
 

This following list, the first column shows the year of the conquest. Some of the cities (like Tabriz, Yerevan or Belgrad) had been conquered more than once. In this case, only the first conquest has been shown. The second column shows the name of the city (where necessary, the Ottoman Turkish name and/or the contemporary Turkish name has also been given in parathesis), the third column shows the holder before conquest and the fourth column shows the present country. In the fifth column links to the article in this encyclopedia for the details of the conquest (where applicable).

See also 
List of Ottoman Empire territories
Battles involving the Ottoman Empire
List of Ottoman sieges and landings

Footnotes

References

Military campaigns involving the Ottoman Empire
Military history of the Ottoman Empire
Cities